Gandalf was a Finnish melodic death metal band who incorporated elements of traditional hard rock into their sound.  Formed in 1993 by drummer (then guitarist) Nalle Österman (later in Shaman, Korpiklaani and Lullacry), guitarist Timo Nyberg and vocalist Jari Hurskainen, with session drummer Mika "Gas Lipstick" Karppinen, who later achieved fame playing with the band HIM. The name Gandalf came from when the founding fans of the band used to refer to Gandalf's guitarist as the guitar wizard, Gandalf (from The Lord of the Rings). Since then, the band decided to call their band Gandalf. Gandalf released both of their albums through Wicked World Records, a subsidiary of Earache Records.

Discography
Deadly Fairytales (1999)
Rock Hell (2001)

References

External links
Gandalf at Earache Records

1993 establishments in Finland
Earache Records artists
Finnish melodic death metal musical groups
Music based on The Lord of the Rings
Musical groups established in 1993